Ellipsoptera puritana, the puritan tiger beetle, is a species of flashy tiger beetle in the family Carabidae. It is found in North America.

References

Further reading

External links

 

Cicindelidae
Articles created by Qbugbot
Beetles described in 1871